Squalidus multimaculatus is a species of cyprinid fish endemic to South Korea.

References

Squalidus
Taxa named by Kazumi Hosoya
Taxa named by Sang-Rin Jeon 
Fish described in 1984